USS Deucalion (AR-15) was the third ship of the Amphion-class of repair ship built for the United States Navy by Tampa Shipbuilding Company during World War II. Named after Deucalion the mythological king of Thessaly, her keel was laid down on December 15, 1944, but her construction was canceled on August 12, 1945, shortly after the Atomic bombings of Hiroshima and Nagasaki.

Designed and built to carry out a primary mission of making emergency and routine repairs to ships of the fleet during periods of technical availability, Deucalion was to be equipped with a wide variety of repair shops: shipfitter, carpentry, pipe and copper, sheet metal, welding, canvas, watch, optical, foundry—in short, facilities that employed skilled artificers capable of repairing hardware from precision watches to heavy machinery and hulls. "These shops are limited in what they can do, only by the size of their equipment." Her modern engineering plant could generate enough electricity for not only herself but ships moored alongside undergoing repairs. Her distilling plant could produce water for herself and for other vessels.

References

External links
http://www.navsource.org/archives/09/25/2515.htm 
http://www.hazegray.org/danfs/auxil/ar15.htm
http://www.destroyers.org/shiplist/ad-ar.htm

 

Amphion-class repair ships
Ships built in Tampa, Florida
1945 ships
World War II auxiliary ships of the United States
Cold War auxiliary ships of the United States